Charles Goldner was an Austrian-born actor who appeared in a number of British films during the 1940s and 1950s. Born in Vienna, Austria, on 7 December 1900, he made his screen debut in the 1940 film Room for Two and went on to appear in Brighton Rock, No Orchids for Miss Blandish, Bond Street and The Captain's Paradise. His stage work included starring in the 1954 Broadway musical The Girl in Pink Tights. He died on 15 April 1955 in London, England.

Partial filmography

 Room for Two (1940) - (uncredited)
 The Seventh Survivor (1942) - Tony Anzoni
 Mr. Emmanuel (1944) - Committee Secretary
 Flight from Folly (1945) - Ramon
 The Laughing Lady (1946) - Robespierre
 Brighton Rock (1948) - Colleoni
 No Orchids for Miss Blandish (1948) - Louis—Headwaiter
 One Night with You (1948) - Fogliati
 Bond Street (1948) - Waiter
 Bonnie Prince Charlie (1948) - Capt. Ferguson
 Third Time Lucky (1949) - Flash Charlie
 Black Magic (1949) - Dr. Franz Anton Mesmer
 Dear Mr. Prohack (1949) - Polish Man Servant
 Give Us This Day (1949) - Luigi
 The Rocking Horse Winner (1949) - Mr. Tsaldouris
 Shadow of the Eagle (1950) - General Korsakov
 I'll Get You for This (1951) - Massine
 The Rival of the Empress (1951) - Generale Korsakoff
 Encore (1951) - Paco Espinal (segment "Gigolo and Gigolette")
 Secret People (1952) - Anselmo
 Top Secret (1952) - Gaston
 South of Algiers (1953) - Petris
 The Captain's Paradise (1953) - Ricco
 The Master of Ballantrae (1953) - Mendoza
 Always a Bride (1953) - Hotel Manager
 Flame and the Flesh (1954) - Mondari
 Duel in the Jungle (1954) - Martell
 The Racers (1955) - Piero, Mechanic
 The End of the Affair (1955) - Savage (final film role)

References

External links

1900 births
1955 deaths
Austrian male film actors
British male film actors
Austrian emigrants to the United Kingdom
Male actors from Vienna
20th-century British male actors
20th-century Austrian male actors